Murt-e Sabz (also Romanized as Mūrt-e Sabz) is a village in Vizhenan Rural District, in the Central District of Gilan-e Gharb County, Kermanshah Province, Iran. At the 2006 census, its population was 156, in 32 families.

References 

Populated places in Gilan-e Gharb County